Albert Bryan may refer to:
 Albertus Bryne (1620s–1668), aka Albert Bryan, English organist and composer
 Albert Vickers Bryan (1899–1984), US federal judge
 Albert Vickers Bryan Jr. (1926–2019), US federal judge and son of Albert Vickers Bryan
 Albert Bryan (politician) (born 1968), Governor of the U.S. Virgin Islands